is a 2019 Japanese superhero film, serving as the film adaptation and alternate ending of the 2018–2019 Japanese Drama Kamen Rider Zi-O. The film also pays tribute to Kamen Rider Drive and introduces the main character of Kamen Rider Zero-One. It was released in Japan on July 26, 2019, in a double billing with Kishiryu Sentai Ryusoulger the Movie: Time Slip! Dinosaur Panic.

The movie's title is a reference to the show's theme song, which also bears the same title.

Plot
Sougo Tokiwa and his friends end up in 16th century Japan during the legendary battle between Oda Nobunaga and Takeda Katsuyori after being approached by Go Shijima and Krim Steinbelt to prevent the latter's ancestor from being killed by a group of time traveling observers known as the "Quartzers", who seek to erase Kamen Rider Drive from history. As Woz reveals himself to be a member of the Quartzers, the truth behind Oma Zi-O is finally revealed.

Cast
: 
: 
: 
: 
: 
: 
: ISSA (Da Pump)
Members of the Quartzers: YORI, TOMO, KIMI, U-YEAH, KENZO, and DAICHI (Da Pump)
: 
: 
: 
: Caleb Bryant
: 
: 
Young Sougo: 
: 
: 
: 
: 
: 
Announcer (Voice): 
: 
Ziku-Driver Equipment Voice: Rikiya Koyama, 
BeyonDriver Equipment Voice:

Theme song

Lyrics: shungo.
Composition: Drew Ryan Scott, MASAT
Arrangement: MASAT
Artist: Da Pump

Reception

Kamen Rider Zi-O the Movie: Over Quartzer grossed $2,765,100 at the box office.

References

External links
 (In Japanese)
 

2010s Kamen Rider films
Cultural depictions of Oda Nobunaga
Kamen Rider Zi-O
Films scored by Toshihiko Sahashi